The large-billed gerygone (Gerygone magnirostris) is a species of bird in the family Acanthizidae found in northern Australia and New Guinea.

Taxonomy
Gerygone magnirostris includes the following subspecies:
 G. m. conspicillata - (Gray, GR, 1859)
 G. m. affinis - Meyer, AB, 1874
 G. m. rosseliana - Hartert, 1899
 G. m. brunneipectus - (Sharpe, 1879)
 G. m. magnirostris - Gould, 1843
 G. m. cairnsensis - Mathews, 1912

References 

Venables B., Pritchard J. and Murphy S. (2007) Novel observations of pre-breeding display structures used by Large-billed Gerygones. Sunbird 37: 30.

large-billed gerygone
Birds of New Guinea
Birds of the Northern Territory
Birds of Queensland
large-billed gerygone